MOA-2011-BLG-262Lb is a Neptune-sized planet or possibly an exomoon orbiting the red dwarf or potentially rogue planet MOA-2011-BLG-262L. If it is an exomoon, then it would be around the size of Mars.

References 

Exomoons
Exoplanets detected by microlensing
Exoplanets discovered in 2013